The 1977 European Amateur Team Championship took place 22–26 June at Royal The Hague Golf & Country Club in Wassenaar, Netherlands. It was the tenth men's golf European Amateur Team Championship.

Venue 
The course, situated in an undulating dune landscape in Wassenaar, 10 kilometres north of the city center of The Hague, Netherlands, was designed in 1938, by Harry Colt and C.H. Alison.

The championship course was set up with par 72.

Format 
Each team consisted of 6 players, playing two rounds of stroke-play over two days, counting the five best scores each day for each team.

The eight best teams formed flight A, in knock-out match-play over the next three days. The teams were seeded based on their positions after the stroke play. The first placed team were drawn to play the quarter final against the eight placed team, the second against the seventh, the third against the sixth and the fourth against the fifth. Teams were allowed to use six players during the team matches, selecting four of them in the two morning foursome games and five players in to the afternoon single games. Games all square at the 18th hole were declared halved, if the team match was already decided.

The eight teams placed 9–16 in the qualification stroke-play formed flight B, to play similar knock-out play to decide their final positions.

Teams 
16 nation teams contested the event. Each team consisted of six players.

Winners 
Defending champions Scotland won the gold medal, earning their second title, in their fourth consecutive final beating Sweden 5–2. Scottish team member Ian Hurcheon, individual leader at the previous championship two years ago as well as at the 1976 Eisenhower Trophy, did not play in the final because of an injury.

Team France, earned the bronze on third place, after beating  Denmark 5–2 in the bronze match.

There was no official award for the lowest individual score in the opening 36-hole stroke-play qualifying competition, but individual leader  was Peter McEvoy, England, with a score of 4-under-par 140, four strokes ahead of nearest competitor. He scored the only sub-70-round of the first day, carding a 69. In the match-play rounds in flight A, McEvoy won all his five games.

The best score of the second round belonged to Jan Lindberg, Denmark, also scoring a 3-under-par 69 round.

Future professional two-time major winner, Sandy Lyle, at 19 years of age, represented England and finished tied 7th individually.

Fritz Porstendorfer, team Austria, made a hole-in-one on the 12th hole.

Results 
Qualification round

Team standings

* Note: In the event of a tie the order was determined by the best total of the two non-counting scores of the two rounds.

Individual leaders

 Note: There was no official award for the lowest individual score.

Flight A

Bracket

Final games

Flight B

Bracket

Final standings

Sources:

See also 
 Eisenhower Trophy – biennial world amateur team golf championship for men organized by the International Golf Federation.
 European Ladies' Team Championship – European amateur team golf championship for women organised by the European Golf Association.

References

External links 
 European Golf Association: Full results

European Amateur Team Championship
Golf tournaments in the Netherlands
European Amateur Team Championship
European Amateur Team Championship
European Amateur Team Championship